The Magharee Islands, also known as "The Seven Hogs", are a group of uninhabited islands located off Rough Point at the northern tip of the Magharee Peninsula in County Kerry, Ireland. The islands, which are part of the parish of Castlegregory, are well known as excellent diving and snorkelling destinations.

The Magharees Sound separates the Seven Hogs from the mainland. A monastic site comprising beehive huts and the ruins of an old church are located on Illauntannig. Scraggane Pier is the nearest landing point on the mainland.

The islands' names are:
 Gurrig Island – Gorach
 Illaunboe – Oileán Bó
 Illaunimmil – Oileán Imill
 Illauntannig – Oileán tSeanaigh (this is the largest of the islands)
 Illaunturlogh – Oileán Traolaigh
 Inishtooskert – Inis Tuaisceart
 Mucklaghbeg Island – An Mhuclach Bheag

The islands were inhabited until the early 1980s but now serve only as summer grazing for the livestock of several local farmers. Up until recently, many farmers would swim their cattle and sheep across to the islands at low tide, rowing alongside them inside Currachs or other small boats. If an animal got into difficulty it was hauled aboard or tied to a boat, or simply left to drown. Nowadays, a modified cage with several flotation devices attached to it, is pulled behind a boat and the crossing is much less taxing on the animals and their owners.  A farmhouse on Illauntannig (the only dwelling on the island) can be rented out on a weekly basis April - September.

Illauntannig

References

Islands of County Kerry
Uninhabited islands of Ireland